Scott Andrew Gardner (born 1 April 1988) is an English former footballer and current coach of Leeds United's under-18s. He most recently played for Conference National side Mansfield Town, where he played as a defender.

He has previously played for England at under-16 and under-17 level.

Playing career

Leeds United
A product of the Leeds United academy, Gardner signed his first professional contract with the club in 2006, then later penned a one-year extension on 19 June 2007. Previously a regular in the Leeds United reserve side, Gardner was involved with the first-team during the 2007–08 pre-season, including playing in a home friendly against Wigan Athletic. Although naturally a right-winger, Gardner played as a right-back during his time at Elland Road.

He made his full debut for Leeds on 14 August 2007 in a 1–0 win against Macclesfield Town in the League Cup.

Farsley Celtic (loan)
On 22 January 2008, Gardner signed a one-month loan deal with Conference National side Farsley Celtic, who are also based in Leeds. Gardner returned from his loan spell in late February 2008. He made an impressive league debut for Leeds in the 2–1 win over Gillingham in May, a game which relegated the Gills.

Farsley Celtic (2nd loan)
On 19 September 2008, Gardner re-joined Farsley Celtic, now in the Conference North, on a one-month loan, playing in three games.

Mansfield Town
On 30 January 2009, Gardner's contract at Leeds United was terminated by mutual consent. Three days later, on 2 February 2009, Gardner signed for Conference National club Mansfield Town until the end of the 2008–09 season along with defender Gianluca Havern. On 16 March 2009, Gardner signed an extension to his Mansfield contract, keeping him at the club until the end of the 2009–10 season.

Coaching career
He currently coaches Leeds United's Under 18s Team.

References

External links

1988 births
Living people
English footballers
Association football defenders
Luxembourgian footballers
Leeds United F.C. players
Farsley Celtic A.F.C. players
Mansfield Town F.C. players
Eastwood Town F.C. players
English Football League players
National League (English football) players
Leeds United F.C. non-playing staff